Moody's pub is a 1941 painting by Australian artist Russell Drysdale. The painting depicts a pub in the Victorian town of Seymour.

The painting has been described as "one of Drysdale's most celebrated paintings and among the most frequently reproduced images of twentieth-century Australian art."

The National Gallery of Victoria acquired the work in 1942; its first acquisition of a Drysdale painting.

References

External links
Moody's pub - Google Cultural Institute

Paintings by Russell Drysdale
1941 paintings
Paintings in the collection of the National Gallery of Victoria